William Meacham is an American archaeologist living and working in Hong Kong since 1970. Meacham has written several books on archaeology in southern China.

In 1977, he published an article on South China archaeology in the journal Current Anthropology, opposing the then general consensus that innovations spread south from the Central Plains of North China. This "nuclear area hypothesis" was promoted by Kwang-chih Chang, the prominent doyen of ancient China archaeology. In 2000, in a preface to his own Festschrift, Chang acknowledged: "On the concept of 'Regional Cultures,' I was very much a late-comer. Judith Treistman (1972) and William Meacham (1977) were both pioneers on this question."

Meacham has written several papers and a book on the restoration of the Shroud of Turin in 2002, where Meacham is questioning the restoration methods used by the Catholic Church.

He recently conducted a successful search to locate a Confederate burial ground of 227 soldiers in Hopkinsville, Kentucky. 
. In researching the epidemic that killed these soldiers encamped at Hopkinsville in 1861, Meacham developed a hypothesis that the disease, at the time called "Black Measles", was  influenza. He published a lengthy article on the subject.

References

External links
Bibliography of Meacham's major publications, most available to download

Living people
Shroud of Turin
Forgery controversies
American archaeologists
American expatriate academics
American expatriates in Hong Kong
Year of birth missing (living people)